Colorado High School is a public high school located in Colorado City, Texas, United States and classified as a 3A school by the UIL. It is part of the Colorado Independent School District. The high school serves students from areas in  Mitchell County. Generally students from the area come from Colorado City or the surrounding area. In 2015, the school was rated "Met Standard" by the Texas Education Agency.

Athletics
The Colorado Wolves compete in these sports - 

Cross Country, Tennis, Football, Basketball, Powerlifting, Golf, Track, Softball, Baseball, & Volleyball

Academics

The Colorado High School Academics teams compete in these events - 

Computer Sciences, Computer Applications, Extemporaneous Speaking, Dramatic Interpretation, Mathematics, Social Studies, Literary Criticism, Debate

References

External links
 Colorado ISD

High schools in Texas
Schools in Mitchell County, Texas
Public high schools in Texas